Cyperus scleropodus is a species of sedge that is native to an area of eastern Africa in northern Somalia.

The species was first formally described by the botanist Emilio Chiovenda in 1928.

See also 
 List of Cyperus species

References 

scleropodus
Taxa named by Emilio Chiovenda
Plants described in 1928
Flora of Somalia